The men's 68 kg competition in Taekwondo at the 2020 Summer Olympics was held on 25 July, at the Makuhari Messe Hall A.

Results

Finals

Repechage

Pool A

Pool B

References

External links
Draw 

Men's 68 kg
Men's events at the 2020 Summer Olympics